The 1993 New Orleans Saints season was the team's 27th as a member of the National Football League (NFL). They were unable to match their previous season's output of 12–4, winning only eight games despite starting the season 5–0. The team failed to qualify for the playoffs for the first time in four years.

Quarterback Bobby Hebert, who was the Saints' starter from late 1985 through 1992, save for a season-long holdout in 1990, signed as a free agent with the division rival Atlanta Falcons. Wade Wilson, who had fallen out of favor with the Minnesota Vikings after the hiring of coach Dennis Green in 1992, was signed as Hebert's replacement.

During a loss to the New York Giants on Monday Night Football, fans in the Louisiana Superdome let out a sarcastic cheer when Wilson was injured. The incident enraged coach Jim Mora, who let loose with a tirade during his post-game press conference.

Offseason

Organizational changes 
Jim Finks, the club's president and general manager since January 1986, was diagnosed with lung cancer in April. He was limited to consulting with team officials by telephone since undergoing chemotherapy. During his absence, most of Finks' day-to-day duties were handled by vice president of administration Jim Miller. On July 14, Finks resigned from all his duties to concentrate on the treatment of his illness.

NFL Draft

Personnel

Staff

Roster

Regular season

Schedule

Standings

References 

New Orleans Saints seasons
New Orleans
New